Pomacanthus is a genus of marine angelfish that is usually found around reefs and coral. Some of the notable places one can see these vari-coloured fish includes the Maldives, Sri Lanka, and Sipidan off the southern coast of Sabah, Malaysia. Generally the patterns and colors of these fish undergo a major transformation from juvenile to adult forms. The juveniles may even appear to be a different species.

Species
The following 13 species are classified within the genus Pomacanthus:

Systematics 
The genus Pomacanthus was created in 1802 by the French naturalist Bernard Germain de Lacépède (1756-1825) with the type species being designated as Chaetodon arcuatus. The name is a compound of poma meaning"lid" and acanthus which means "thorn", a reference to the prominents spine on the rear margin of the operculum, a feature shared by all the marine angelfishes.

Some authorities divide the genus up into the following subgenera:

 Pomacanthus Lacépède, 1802
 Pomacanthus (Pomacanthus) arcuatus
 Pomacanthus (Pomacanthus) paru
 Pomacanthus (Pomacanthus) zonipectus 
 Acanthochaetodon Bleeker, 1876 
 Pomacanthus (Acanthochaetodon) annularis
 Pomacanthus (Acanthochaetodon) chrysurus
 Pomacanthus (Acanthochaetodon) imperator
 Pomacanthus (Acanthochaetodon) rhomboides
 Arusetta Fraser-Brunner, 1933
 Pomacanthus (Arusetta) asfur
 Pomacanthus (Arusetta) maculosus
 Pomacanthus (Arusetta) semicirculatus
 Euxiphipops Fraser-Brunner 1934
 Pomacanthus (Euxiphipops) navarchus
 Pomacanthus (Euxiphipops) sexstriatus
 Pomacanthus (Euxiphipops) xanthometopon

References

 
Pomacanthidae
Extant Late Cretaceous first appearances
Marine fish genera
Taxa named by Bernard Germain de Lacépède